Zharki is the name of several rural localities in Russia.

Chelyabinsk Oblast
As of 2012, one rural locality in Chelyabinsk Oblast bears this name:
Zharki, Chelyabinsk Oblast, a village in Berezovsky Selsoviet of Krasnoarmeysky District

Ivanovo Oblast
As of 2012, two rural localities in Ivanovo Oblast bear this name:
Zharki, Savinsky District, Ivanovo Oblast, a village in Savinsky District
Zharki, Yuryevetsky District, Ivanovo Oblast, a selo in Yuryevetsky District

Kostroma Oblast
As of 2012, two rural localities in Kostroma Oblast bear this name:
Zharki, Galichsky District, Kostroma Oblast, a village in Dmitriyevskoye Settlement of Galichsky District; 
Zharki, Sudislavsky District, Kostroma Oblast, a village in Raslovskoye Settlement of Sudislavsky District;

Novgorod Oblast
As of 2012, two rural localities in Novgorod Oblast bear this name:
Zharki, Pestovsky District, Novgorod Oblast, a village in Laptevskoye Settlement of Pestovsky District
Zharki, Volotovsky District, Novgorod Oblast, a village in Gorskoye Settlement of Volotovsky District

Pskov Oblast
As of 2012, five rural localities in Pskov Oblast bear this name:
Zharki, Loknyansky District, Pskov Oblast, a village in Loknyansky District
Zharki, Opochetsky District, Pskov Oblast, a village in Opochetsky District
Zharki, Porkhovsky District, Pskov Oblast, a village in Porkhovsky District
Zharki, Pskovsky District, Pskov Oblast, a village in Pskovsky District
Zharki, Pushkinogorsky District, Pskov Oblast, a village in Pushkinogorsky District

Vladimir Oblast
As of 2012, one rural locality in Vladimir Oblast bears this name:
Zharki, Vladimir Oblast, a village in Sudogodsky District

Vologda Oblast
As of 2012, one rural locality in Vologda Oblast bears this name:
Zharki, Vologda Oblast, a village in Shalimovsky Selsoviet of Cherepovetsky District

Yaroslavl Oblast
As of 2012, two rural localities in Yaroslavl Oblast bear this name:
Zharki, Nekouzsky District, Yaroslavl Oblast, a village in Novinsky Rural Okrug of Nekouzsky District
Zharki, Tutayevsky District, Yaroslavl Oblast, a village in Borisoglebsky Rural Okrug of Tutayevsky District